Diego Rivas may refer to:
Diego Rivas (footballer, born 1980), Spanish football midfielder
Diego Rivas (footballer, born 1987), Spanish football goalkeeper
Diego Rivas (fighter) (born 1991), Chilean boxer and mixed martial artist